The 2018 Iowa Hawkeyes football team represented the University of Iowa during the 2018 NCAA Division I FBS football season. The Hawkeyes played their home games at Kinnick Stadium in Iowa City, Iowa and competed in the West Division of the Big Ten Conference. They were led by Kirk Ferentz in his 20th season as head coach.

Iowa began the year with six wins in their first seven games, with their sole loss during that span coming in their conference opener against Wisconsin. The Hawkeyes rose to 18th in the AP Poll, but lost three consecutive games to knock them from the polls. They ended the regular season with two more wins to finish tied for second in the West Division with a conference record of 5–4. They were invited to the 2019 Outback Bowl, where they defeated Mississippi State. Iowa finished with a record of 9–4 and were ranked 25th in the final AP Poll, their first ranked finish and highest win total since 2015.

Quarterback Nate Stanley led the team in passing with 2,852 yards and 26 touchdowns, good for second in the Big Ten Conference in the latter category. The Hawkeyes featured two standout tight ends, with Noah Fant and T. J. Hockenson both earning first-team all-conference honors. Hockenson was awarded the John Mackey Award as the nation's top tight end. Iowa became the first school to have two tight ends chosen in the first round of an NFL Draft when Hockenson and Fant both were both selected in the first 20 picks of the 2019 NFL Draft. Defensive end A. J. Epenesa led the Big Ten in both sacks and forced fumbles. He was joined on the all-conference first-team by safety Amani Hooker, who was named the Big Ten's Defensive Back of the Year.

Previous season
The Hawkeyes finished the 2017 season 8–5, 4–5 in Big Ten play to finish in a tie for third place in the West Division. They received an invitation to the Pinstripe Bowl where they defeated Boston College.

Offseason

Recruiting

Position key

2018 commitments

The Hawkeyes signed a total of 23 recruits.

Preseason

Award watch lists

Schedule

Source

Roster

Rankings

Game summaries

Northern Illinois

Source: Box Score 

After a slow start, the Hawkeyes scored touchdowns on three straight possessions en route to a 30-point second half. The win was the 144th for head coach Kirk Ferentz, making him the all-time winningest coach in Iowa football history. After an opening drive 3 and out for the Hawkeyes, NIU blocked the punt and had the ball at the Iowa 20. However, a missed field goal swung momentum back to the home team. The only first half points came on a 33-yard field goal from Hawkeye kicker Miguel Recinos. After a slow 3rd quarter, Heisman hopeful Nate Stanley threw his first touchdown of the year, a 1-yard pitch-and-catch to tight end Noah Fant. On the ensuing drive, running back Ivory Kelly-Martin barreled in on a 3rd and goal play to make it 17–0 going into the 4th quarter. After another short field, Toren Young found pay dirt on a 6-yard effort, and it was 24–0 Iowa. After a great punt by Colton Rastetter, NIU got the ball inside their own 1 yard line. on 2nd down, the Hawkeyes forced a safety, and after getting the ball back off the safety punt, backup quarterback Peyton Mansell got his first career touchdown on a quarterback sneak. After Iowa put their 2nd team defense in, the Huskies marched down the field in an impressive 11 play, 75 yard drive to put some late points on the scoreboard. Iowa shook off the slow 1st half and routed NIU 33–7 inside of Kinnick Stadium during the annual Gold Game.

Iowa State

Source: Box Score  }}

Neither offense could get going in this in-state rivalry contest. Iowa was the only team to find the endzone and with only a few minutes left in the fourth quarter. An A. J. Epenesa strip-sack sealed this low-scoring affair to keep the Cy-Hawk trophy in Iowa City for a fourth straight year.

Northern Iowa

Source: Box Score 

The Panthers were able to play with the Hawkeyes for a while but Iowa's depth proved to be ultimately overwhelming for FCS opponent Northern Iowa. Iowa ended the game with nearly 550 yards of total offense and the final score wasn't indicative of how one-sided this match-up was as the Hawkeyes played their second string for most of the fourth quarter. Iowa's defense had a relentless effort holding Northern Iowa to minus-2 rushing yards in the first half.

Wisconsin

Source: Box Score

at Minnesota

Source: Box Score 

The Hawkeyes spoiled the Gophers' homecoming in this high-scoring rivalry game. A signature play of the game came on a fake field goal trick play in which T. J. Hockenson took a lateral pass in for a touchdown which helped Iowa secure a lead going into halftime. The play is called "Herky" and was a New Kirk era technique that had yet to been implemented. The Hawks prevailed to keep Floyd of Rosedale in Iowa City for a fourth year in a row.

at Indiana

Source: Box Score

Nate Stanley became the third Iowa quarterback to throw six touchdown passes in a single game. Tight ends T. J. Hockenson and Noah Fant each had over 100 yards receiving, totaling eight receptions for 208 yards and three TD.

Maryland

Source: Box Score

Iowa held visitor Maryland to just 115 yards of total offense in this shutout homecoming victory. Iowa did struggle to find the end zone but three Miguel Recinos field goals kept Iowa in the driver's seat for most of the way.

at Penn State

Source: Box Score

at Purdue

Source: Box Score

Northwestern

Source: Box Score

at Illinois

Source: Box Score 

Kirk Ferentz recorded his 150th win at Iowa, the 5th head coach in Big Ten history to reach the mark, in this blowout victory over Illinois. After a sluggish start in the first quarter, Iowa dominated in every phase of the game the rest of the way. Not only scoring on offense but on defense and special teams as well.

Nebraska

Source: Box Score 

Iowa led the whole way until the final minutes of this nail-biting victory. Nebraska never backed down and tied the game up with 3:22 to play. Miguel Recinos kicked a game-winning field goal as time expired to keep the Heroes Trophy in Iowa City for the fourth year in a row.

vs. Mississippi State (Outback Bowl)

Source: Box Score 

In a back-and-forth game, Iowa held on to defeat SEC opponent Mississippi State. Senior Jake Gervase made a critical interception in the end zone, and batted down a fourth down pass to end the Bulldogs' hopes. The victory was Ferentz's fifth January bowl win and eighth overall bowl victory.

Awards and honors

Players in the 2019 NFL Draft

References

Iowa
Iowa Hawkeyes football seasons
ReliaQuest Bowl champion seasons
Iowa Hawkeyes football